Shahrak-e Modarres is a village in Qaleh Hashem Rural District, Shal District, Buin Zahra County, Qazvin Province, Iran. At the 2006 census, its population was 2,560, in 689 families.

References 

Populated places in Buin Zahra County